The engine used in the Fiat S.76 land speed record vehicle is a large-displacement, four-cylinder engine, designed and developed by Fiat, in 1910.

Overview

After the 2 car engine was built from 1910 and 1911, FIAT built a similar engine for an airship, changing the valves to 3 (two exhausts and one intake) and the spark plugs to 3 (the car engine had 2 spark plugs) That engine was built from 1912 to 1913, and was used on Forlanini airships.

In November 2014, Pittaway and a team of motorists managed to return the S76 engine to working order including Leonardo E. M. Sordi an Italian Air Force consultant and historic expert of mechanics and magneto, to rebuild a full ignition system (including spark plugs), full set of engine bearings whit shell and white metal, and rework the original crankcase n°2 for realignment of the bench supports, deformed in over 100 years of history; although more work was needed before the car was fully operational. This was completed in 2015 and the "Beast of Turin" was displayed and driven for the first time in almost a century at the Goodwood Festival of Speed between 23 and 26 June 2015.

Applications
Fiat S76 Record

Reference 

Engines by model
Fiat engines
Gasoline engines by model
Straight-four engines